Antricola is a genus of tick containing 16 species. It is very similar to the genus Nothoaspis, which contains the species Nothoaspis reddelli.
Antricola delacruzi Estrada-Pena, Barros-Battesti & Venzal, 2004
Antricola guglielmonei Estrada-Pena, Barros-Battesti & Venzal, 2004
Antricola inexpectata
Antricola marginatus
Antricola mexicanus

References

Ticks
Argasidae